Carole Basri is an American filmmaker and lawyer of Iraqi Jewish descent.  Most of her productions focus on the History of the Jews in Iraq as she documents her ancestral roots and discusses Jewish traditions in Iraq.

Work
 The Last Jews Of Bagdad; End Of An Exile Beginning Of A Journey
 Searching for Baghdad: A Daughter’s Journey

References

External links
Carole Basri at PLI: Faculty Profile
Searching for Baghdad: A Daughter’s Journey

American women film directors
American people of Iraqi-Jewish descent
Year of birth missing (living people)
Living people
21st-century American women